The 17063/64 Ajanta Express is an Express train belonging to the South Central Railway Zone that runs between Secunderabad in Telangana and Manmad in Maharashtra in India.

History

Ajanta Express runs through eastern Maharashtra (Marathwada region) and the north-western region of Telangana. It was known as Kacheguda Express very often by the people travelling on Kacheguda–Nizamabad–Nanded–Aurangabad route on former Hyderabad–Godavari Valley Railways.

The train was introduced on 1st April, 1967 as a metre-gauge train between Kacheguda and Manmad via Nizamabad, Nanded and Aurangabad. The train became popular in a short time as Manmad on  broad gauge was the point to take broad gauge trains to other destinations.

After the track from Manmad to Parbhani was converted to broad gauge in 1992–95 and the track from Parbhani to Mudkhed and Nizamabad was still not converted, the train was re-routed between Kacheguda and Manmad via Bidar and Parbhani in 1995–1996 because the metre gauge had been converted between Vikarabad and Parbhani by then. In 2007, the train again diverted to its old route which had been converted into broad gauge in 2002–2003.

Overview

The train is named after the Ajanta Caves in Aurangabad. It runs daily and connects important stations such as Nizamabad, Nanded, Aurangabad and Nagarsol.

The 17063 Manmad–Secunderabad Ajanta Express has an average speed of 52 km/h and covers 620 km in 12 hours. The 17064 Secunderabad–Manmad Ajanta Express has an average speed of 47 km/h and covers 620 km in 13 hours and 15 minutes.

Timings

The train departs from Secunderabad Junction at 6:50 p.m. and arrives at Manmad Junction at 8:05 a.m. the next day. It departs from Manmad Junction at 8:50 p.m. and arrives at Secunderabad Junction at 8:50 a.m. the next day.

Halts

  Manmad Junction
  Nagarsol
  Rotegaon
  Lasur
  Aurangabad
  Jalna
  Parbhani Junction
  Purna Junction
  Hazur Sahib Nanded
  Mudkhed Junction
  Umri
  Dharmabad
  Basar
  Nizamabad Junction
  Kamareddi
  Wadiaram
  Medchal
  Bolarum
  Secunderabad Junction

Classes

The train usually consists of 24 standard ICF coaches:

 1 AC first cum II tier
 1 AC II tier
 5 AC III tiers
 12 sleeper classes
 1 pantry car
 4 second sittings

As it is customary with most other train services in India, coach composition may be amended at the discretion of Indian Railways, depending on demand.

Coach composition

Rake sharing
Since 1 January 2018, it started to share its rakes with 12703/04 Falaknuma Express with Primary Maintenance at Secunderabad Junction.

Loco link

As the route is not completley electrified, Moula Ali (MLY)-based WDM-3A/WDG-3A twins haul the train to complete its full journey.

See also
 Nizamabad–Kacheguda DEMU
 Devagiri Express
 Bhopal Shatabdi
 Rajkot Secunderabad Express

References

External links
Ajanta Express Time Table

Transport in Manmad
Transport in Secunderabad
Railway services introduced in 1967
Named passenger trains of India
Transport in Aurangabad, Maharashtra
Rail transport in Maharashtra
Transport in Telangana
Transport in Nanded
1967 establishments in Andhra Pradesh
Express trains in India
1967 establishments in Maharashtra